Arenig can mean:
The Arenig geological period
Arenig Fawr, a mountain in Wales
The Arenigs, mountains in Wales
Arenig railway station in Wales: it closed down in 1960 and 1961